Teofil Ioncu (22 July 1885, in Olișcani – 16 March 1954, in Iași) was a Bessarabian and Romanian politician, member of Sfatul Țării.

Biography 
Teofil Ioncu studied at the Moscow Higher Institute and the Higher Business School of the University of Leipzig. From 1913-1914 he was one of the permanent contributors to the magazine Cuvânt Moldovenesc.

Political activity 
On April 3, 1917, he took part in the establishment of the National Moldavian Party. On May 20, 1917, he is elected president of the first Student Congress, which has as topic of discussion the election of the National Moldavian Party. In the summer of the same year, he is sent as a voting delegate by NMP from Chișinău near the Verkhovna Rada to support the interests of Romanians in Bessarabia.

He served as Member of the Moldovan Parliament (1917–1918).

Awards 
 Order of Ferdinand I, in the grade Commander;
 Order of the Star of Romania, in the grade Officer.

Gallery

Bibliography 
Gheorghe E. Cojocaru, Sfatul Țării: itinerar, Civitas, Chişinău, 1998, 
Mihai Taşcă, Sfatul Țării şi actualele autorităţi locale, "Timpul de dimineaţă", no. 114 (849), 27 June 2008 (page 16)

External links 
 Arhiva pentru Sfatul Tarii
 Deputaţii Sfatului Ţării şi Lavrenti Beria

Notes

Romanian people of Moldovan descent
1885 births
1954 deaths
People from Șoldănești District
Moldovan MPs 1917–1918
Expatriates from the Russian Empire in Germany